= Ray Laplante =

Canadian ice hockey player

- Born: December 15, 1925 (age 100) Lachine, Quebec, Canada
- Height: 5 ft 10 in (178 cm)
- Weight: 155 lb (70 kg; 11 st 1 lb)
- Position: Center
- Shot: Right
- Played for: Providence Reds
- Playing career: 1942–1961

Joseph Adrien Raymond Laplante (born December 15, 1925) is a Canadian former professional hockey player who played 435 games for the Providence Reds in the American Hockey League.
